Paweł Cieślik (born 12 April 1986 in Poznań) is a Polish cyclist, who currently rides for UCI Continental team .

Major results

2007
 3rd Giro del Canavese
2010
 2nd National Hill Climb Championships
2011
 3rd National Hill Climb Championships
 5th Overall Tour of Małopolska
 5th Memoriał Henryka Łasaka
 6th Puchar Ministra Obrony Narodowej
 10th Overall Okolo Slovenska
1st Stage 4
2012
 1st Stage 7 Bałtyk–Karkonosze Tour
 2nd Overall Tour of Małopolska
1st Stage 2
2013
 1st Stage 8 Bałtyk–Karkonosze Tour
 2nd Overall Tour of Małopolska
 3rd Memoriał Henryka Łasaka
 6th Overall Okolo Jižních Čech
2014
 1st Grand Prix Královéhradeckého kraje
 2nd Overall Okolo Jižních Čech
 3rd Overall Tour of Małopolska
 3rd Overall Oberösterreich Rundfahrt
1st Stage 2
 7th Overall Szlakiem Grodów Piastowskich
 9th Tour Bohemia
2015
 2nd Overall East Bohemia Tour
 3rd Overall Okolo Slovenska
 4th Memoriał Henryka Łasaka
 5th Overall Czech Cycling Tour
 6th Overall Szlakiem Grodów Piastowskich
 6th Overall Black Sea Cycling Tour
2016
 5th Velothon Wales
 8th Visegrad 4 Bicycle Race – GP Czech Republic
2017
 1st Stage 1 (TTT) Czech Cycling Tour
 2nd Overall Course de Solidarność et des Champions Olympiques
 5th Overall East Bohemia Tour
 6th Visegrad 4 Bicycle Race – GP Czech Republic
 7th Memoriał Romana Siemińskiego
 8th Overall Tour of Slovenia
2018
 2nd Overall Tour of Małopolska
 3rd Overall Bałtyk–Karkonosze Tour
1st Mountains classification
2019
 2nd Road race, National Road Championships
 9th Memoriał Andrzeja Trochanowskiego
 9th Korona Kocich Gór
 10th Overall Tour of Małopolska
2020
 10th Overall Tour of Bulgaria
 10th Overall Tour of Małopolska
2021
 2nd Overall Tour of Małopolska
 2nd Overall In the Steps of Romans
 7th Overall Tour de Hongrie
2022
 5th Road race, National Road Championships
 10th Overall Tour of Małopolska

References

External links

1986 births
Living people
Polish male cyclists
Sportspeople from Poznań